Pinle is an archaeological excavation site, located in Myittha Township, Mandalay Region, Myanmar. Pinle was a capital of the Myinsaing Kingdom from 1297 to 1313.

Pinle today is  a village on the edge of the walled Pyu complex which is known as Maingmaw.

References

Populated places in Mandalay Region